The 2009 ORLEN Platinum Rally Poland was the 66th running of the Rally Poland and the eighth round of the 2009 World Rally Championship season. Rally Poland had previously been part of the WRC schedule during the inaugural 1973 season. The rally consisted of 18 special stages and was won by Ford's Mikko Hirvonen, who took his first-ever back-to-back victories. However, the team's celebration was subdued after Jari-Matti Latvala crashed out from second place on the final super special stage, losing important manufacturers' championship points.

Citroën's Dani Sordo then finished second and Stobart's Henning Solberg beat his brother Petter to take the final podium spot. Home country's Krzysztof Hołowczyc, a three-time winner of the event, finished sixth behind regular Stobart driver Matthew Wilson. This marked the first time a Polish driver scored WRC points in the history of the series.

Citroën's defending world champion Sébastien Loeb lost the drivers' championship lead by crashing out in the second rally in a row. However, he re-joined the event under superally rules and with mechanical problems for Andreas Mikkelsen, Mads Østberg and Sébastien Ogier, he had climbed back into the top ten. Citroën then issued team orders and Citroën Junior Team's Conrad Rautenbach and Evgeny Novikov both stopped for enough minutes to let the Frenchman take the eighth place, which eventually became seventh after Latvala's mistake.

Results

Special stages

Championship standings after the event

Drivers' championship

Manufacturers' championship

References

External links
Full results at WRC.com

Poland
Rally of Poland
Rally Poland